Sebekoro or Sebecoro is a small town and commune in the Kita Cercle in the Kayes Region of south-western Mali. In 1998 the commune had a population of 13,445.

References

Communes of Kayes Region